In Hinduism, sanchita karma (heaped together) is one of the three kinds of karma. It is the sum of one's past karmas – all actions, good and bad, from one's past lives follow through to the next life. Out of this, we each lifetime, we choose prarabdha karma, a collection of past karmas, which are ready to be experienced through the present incarnation.

References

See also
 Karma in Hinduism
Kriyamana karma

Karma in Hinduism
Hindi words and phrases
Hindu philosophical concepts

zh:前世業